Ujagar Singh was a Fiji Indian politician who was elected to the Legislative Council in the 1968 by-election from the Nasinu Indian Communal Constituency.

References 

Fijian Sikhs
National Federation Party politicians
Indian members of the Legislative Council of Fiji
Living people
Year of birth missing (living people)